Jessica Esther "Jess" Fox  (born 11 June 1994) is a French-born Australian world and Olympic champion slalom canoeist who has competed at the international level since 2008.

She qualified for the 2012 Summer Olympics in London, where she made her Olympic debut at 18 years of age, winning a silver medal in the K1 event. She won a bronze medal in the same event four years later in Rio de Janeiro, and again at the 2020 Tokyo Summer Olympics.  She won gold at the 2020 Olympics in the C1 event, becoming the first Olympic champion in that event.

Fox has won 19 medals at the ICF Canoe Slalom World Championships with twelve golds (C1: 2013, 2014, 2015, 2018; K1: 2014, 2017, 2018; C1 team: 2013, 2015, 2019; Extreme K1: 2021, 2022), five silvers (C1: 2019, 2022, K1: 2019, 2022, C1 team: 2017) and two bronzes (C1: 2010, K1 team: 2017). Her 8 gold medals in individual events make her the most successful paddler, male or female, in World Championship history. She also won a gold medal at the 2010 Summer Youth Olympics in the K1 event.

Fox, an 8-time world champion and Olympic champion, is considered the greatest individual paddler of all time.

Personal life
Fox was born on 11 June 1994 in Marseille, France, later moving to Penrith, New South Wales.
Fox's parents are Richard Fox and Myriam Fox-Jerusalmi, who both competed as canoeists at the Olympics: her father for Great Britain at the 1992 Games, and her mother at the 1996 Games who won a bronze medal for France. Her father is Second Vice President of the International Canoe Federation as well as Australian Canoeing's current high-performance manager, and a five-time world champion. Fox is Jewish, as is her mother Myriam Jerusalmi; whereas her father is not Jewish. Her younger sister Noemie Fox is also a slalom canoeist, as was her aunt Rachel Crosbee.

Fox attended Blaxland High School, and finished her HSC year by being first in New South Wales in the PDHPE in 2011 and had an ATAR score of 99.1.  She studied in the Elite Athlete Program at The University of Sydney where she is working on a degree in media/communications. She is studying a Bachelor of Social Science (Psychology) at Swinburne Online. She is bilingual in English and French.

Fox suffered a back injury that impacted her performance in 2012. In May 2012, she spoke at the Chullora Public School. She celebrated her 18th birthday on 11 June 2012 in Cardiff while competing at a World Cup event. Fox is also an avid dog lover, regularly posting "dog selfies" to her social media platforms. Fox has featured all types of breeds, ranging from Jack Russels to Labradoodles. Fox's most popular #dogselfie was with a Swiss Shepherd named Hendrix.

Career
Fox races in K1 and C1 events and is coached by her mother, Myriam. She started in the sport in 2005 by canoeing on the Nepean River. She has a scholarship and is affiliated with the Australian Institute of Sport and the New South Wales Institute of Sport. In club competitions, she represents the Penrith Valley Canoe Club.

In September 2009, Fox made her Australian senior national team bid. She competed at the ICF World Ranking in Merano, Italy in 2009 where she finished third in the K1 event. At the 2009 AYOF event in Penrith, New South Wales, she finished first in the women's K1 event.

Fox won placed 5th in the K1 event and won a bronze medal in the C1 event at the 2010 World Championships in Tacen. At the 2010 Summer Youth Olympics in Singapore, she won the gold in the girls' K1 slalom event. At the 2010 Junior World Championships in Foix, Jessica won gold in K1, also winning the inaugural C1 event at that level. She won her first World Cup by taking out the C1 event at the third round in La Seu d'Urgell. Domestically, Fox won the C1 event and placed 9th in the K1 event at the Oceania Continental Championships in Penrith (counting to World Cup points) and placed 1st and 3rd at the National Championships in Eildon, Victoria, in the C1 and K1 events respectively.

In 2011, Fox won gold medals in the C1 event at World Cups 2 and 3. At the 2011 World Championships in Bratislava, Slovakia, she finished 19th, which gave Australia an automatic spot in the event at the 2012 Summer Olympics. She won silver medals at Australian Open and the Oceania Championships in the women's K1 event in 2011.

In 2012 Fox was selected to represent Australia for the first time at the Olympics in the women's K1 event, where she won the silver medal at the age of 18. Her pre-Olympic schedule included training on the Olympic course in London in April, and World Cup competitions in Wales, France and Spain, plus the Junior World Championship in the United States. Her result has been described as competitive revenge against the 44-year-old Czech paddler Štěpánka Hilgertová, who had beaten Fox's mother Myriam to the K1 gold medal sixteen years earlier in the Atlanta 1996 Summer Olympics. Her silver medal improved on her mother's bronze from Atlanta 1996 and her father's fourth place in Barcelona 1992, and earned her the nickname "the Silver Fox" from teammates and the press.

She won her first World Championship titles in the C1 event and the C1 team event at the 2013 World Championships in Prague.

At the 2014 World Championships at Deep Creek Lake, USA, Fox became the first athlete to win the C1 and K1 events at the same World Championships, besting Jana Dukátová, who became the first to do it at separate events winning a world championship title in K1 in 2006 and C1 in 2010.

In 2016, Fox won her second Olympic medal, with a bronze in the K1 in Rio de Janeiro, Brazil.  After winning multiple World Cup races, she won the overall World Cup title in the  Kayak Single Slalom (K1) and was second overall in Canoe Single Slalom (C1). She also won the U23 World Championships in K1 and C1 in Kraków, Poland. Additionally, she also won the Oceania Championships Slalom C1 in Penrith, Australia.

In 2017, Fox won the K1 event at the 2017 World Championships, a number of World Cup medals, the Canoeist of the Year award, and the NSW Athlete of the Year award. In 2018, Fox was a double ICF Canoe World Champion in C1 and K1, and again won a number of World Cups in both disciplines. Her 2018 season featured an undefeated run in C1 (winning all five World Cups and the World Championships), and three consecutive 'Golden Doubles' at the first three World Cups. In 2019, she won the Oceania Championships in Canoe Slalom again, as well as the World Cup Overall in both events.

She finished third to win the bronze medal in the women's canoe slalom K1 at the 2020 Tokyo Olympics, where she also gained media attention for using a condom to repair her kayak.  In Tokyo Jess was also the fastest qualifier for the final of the inaugural C1 canoe slalom event, and went on to win the gold medal, beating silver medalist Mallory Franklin of Great Britain by more than three seconds with a penalty-free run.

At the 2021 World Championships in Bratislava, Fox did not progress to the final of either the K1 or C1 for the first time in her entire career, after incurring 50-second penalties in the semi-finals of both. On the final day of competition she became World Champion in the extreme slalom event, an 8th individual world title in a 3rd unique event, in just her third international appearance in the event which will make its Olympic debut at Paris 2024.

Fox has won the overall World Cup title five times in the C1 class (2013, 2015, 2017, 2018, 2019) and four times in the K1 class (2018, 2019, 2021, 2022). She has finished the year as the World No. 1 in C1 10 times, including an uninterrupted streak from 2013 to 2021, and World No. 1 in K1 6 times. She is currently the highest ranked athlete in both events.

Results

World Cup individual podiums

1 Oceania Canoe Slalom Open counting for World Cup points

Complete World Cup results

Honours
Fox was the 2010 Penrith Press Junior Sports Star of the year and NewsLocal Medal winner. She has also served as the ambassador for the Premier's Sporting Challenge. In 2010, she was also named the Cumberland Courier Junior Sport Star, NSWIS Junior Athlete of the Year and the Pierre de Coubertin AOC award. In 2009, 2010 and 2011, she was named the Junior Canoeist of the Year Australian Canoeing. In 2011, she was named the Australian Canoeing Athlete of the Year. She earned the AIS Secondary Education award in 2011. She was awarded AIS Sport Performance Awards – Athlete of the Year for 2014. In 2018, she won AIS Sport Performance Award Female Athlete of the Year.

In the 2022 Australia Day Honours Fox was awarded the Medal of the Order of Australia.

Television
In 2017, Fox appeared as a celebrity contestant on the Australian version of Hell's Kitchen. She came 7th overall.

See also
List of select Jewish canoeists
List of Youth Olympic Games gold medalists who won Olympic gold medals

References

External links

1994 births
Australian female canoeists
Australian people of English descent
Australian people of French-Jewish descent
French emigrants to Australia
Jewish Australian sportspeople
Jewish French sportspeople
Living people
Canoeists at the 2010 Summer Youth Olympics
Canoeists at the 2012 Summer Olympics
Canoeists at the 2016 Summer Olympics
French people of English descent
Olympic canoeists of Australia
Olympic medalists in canoeing
Olympic silver medalists for Australia
Olympic bronze medalists for Australia
New South Wales Institute of Sport alumni
Medalists at the 2012 Summer Olympics
Medalists at the 2016 Summer Olympics
Sportspeople from Marseille
Medalists at the ICF Canoe Slalom World Championships
People from the Blue Mountains (New South Wales)
Youth Olympic gold medalists for Australia
Canoeists at the 2020 Summer Olympics
Medalists at the 2020 Summer Olympics
Olympic gold medalists for Australia
Recipients of the Medal of the Order of Australia
Sportswomen from New South Wales